Leonel Álvarez may refer to:

 Leonel Álvarez (footballer, born 1965), Colombian footballer
 Leonel Álvarez (footballer, born 1995), Argentine footballer
 Leonel Álvarez (footballer, born 1996), Argentine footballer